Since being founded in 1819, Colgate University has had a rich tradition of student societies. Literary societies, Greek letter organizations, Non-Greek letter organizations, honor societies, and even secret societies have all played a part in Colgate history.

Some uncited information in this table is taken from: The History of Greek Life

Greek life

Fraternities were first brought to Colgate in 1856 when Delta Kappa Epsilon (DKE) was granted a chapter. The first sorority was brought to Colgate in 1982 when a chapter of Gamma Phi Beta (Gamma Phi) received a charter.

Secret societies

Secret or underground organizations have had a widespread existence at Colgate University.  Many of the school's original societies had roots as underground organizations. In terms of secret honor societies, Colgate has also had its fair share. Two secret Honor Societies, the Gorgon's Head and Skull and Scroll, enjoyed a period as rival societies until 1934 when they merged to form Konosioni, now known as the Tredecim Senior Honor Society.  Even with its history, Tredecim is no longer a secret society but is now seen as a leadership society, with only 26 members of each graduating class peer-selected to membership.

References

Colgate University
Colgate